The siege of Moscow was part of Mongol invasion of Rus.

Prelude 
After the destruction of Ryazan on December 21, 1237, Grand Prince Yuri II sent his sons Vsevolod and Vladimir with most of Vladimir-Suzdal army to stop Mongol invaders at Kolomna. There, the Russian army was defeated, and survivors scattered and fled North, to Vladimir and Moscow.

Siege 
After destruction of Kolomna in January 1238, Prince Vladimir, younger son of Yuri II of Vladimir, fled to Moscow with a small force of survivors. "And the men of Moscow ran away having seen nothing", according to The Chronicle of Novgorod. At the time Moscow was but a fortified village, a trading post "on a crossroads of four rivers". The small, wooden fort was taken after five days of siege.

Aftermath 
Prince Vladimir was captured and executed two weeks later, before the eyes of the defenders of Vladimir.

References 

Moscow 1238
Battles of the Mongol invasion of Kievan Rus'
Siege of 1238
1238 in Europe
Conflicts in 1238
13th century in Russia
Moscow